Astro Vinmeen HD is a Malaysia Tamil language high-definition free-to-view commercial satellite entertainment television channel network that is co-owned by Southeast Asia's second richest man, Ananda Krishnan and Astro Malaysia Holdings. It is South East Asia’s first 24-hour general entertainment Tamil HD channel. This channel features a variety of programs ranging from reality shows, English talk shows, travelogues, lifestyle programs, magic shows, Documentaries, celebrity cooking shows, classical Carnatic music shows, original Astro productions and blockbuster movies. It began broadcasting on 18 October 2013. Astro Vinmeen HD is part of the Basic HD channels.

Selected programmes also aired on Astro Vaanavil. It also broadcasts content from Vasantham, Puthuyugam TV and Vendhar TV. The channel holds the Guinness World Records for the Longest Live Streamed festival, with 55 hours non-stop live streaming of Thaipusam festival on 22 to 25 January 2016.

Programmes

Current broadcast

Astro Dramas

Monday-Friday (9.00-9.30 pm)

 Kalvanai Kandupidi (1 - 31 July 2020)
 Kalyaanam 2 Kaadhal (1 - 30 September 2020)
 Yaar Avan (1 - 31 October 2020)
 Ramarajan (2 - 30 November 2020)
 Kuruthi Mazhai (1 - 31 December 2020)
 Serial Pei (4 - 30 January 2021)
 Asura Vettai (1 - 27 February 2021)
 Sivanthu Pochi Nenje (1 - 31 March 2021)
 Mente (1 - 30 April 2021)
 Manmadha Bullets (3 - 31 May 2021)
 Ramarajan 2.0 (1-31 June 2021)
 Avatharam ( 1July-6 August 2021) 
 Solli Tholeh (reprise, 6-20 August 2021)
 Kavasam ( 22 August-5 November 2021) 
 Kalyaanam 2 Kaadhal Season 2 (8 November 2021 – 12 January 2022) 
 Kadhaanayagi (1 February- 2 March 2022)
 Iraivi Thirumagal Kaadu ( 3 March - 1 April 2022) 
 Virus (4-29 April 2022)
 Astra (May-June 2022)
 Magarantham (August-September 2022)
 Oru Kalaignanyin Diary (October-November 2022)
 Venghaiyin Magan (November-16 December 2022)
 Veera (19 December 2022 - 27 January 2023)
 Zombie Kaadhali (30 January- 6 March 2023)
Manmadha Bullets Reloaded (Start 7 March 2023)
Saturday and Sunday (7.30-8.00 pm)

 Solli Tholeh (5 September - 8 November 2020)

Saturday (9.00-9.30 pm)
 Nadunisi KL (Early 2022) (now this series telecasted at friday, 9.30 pm on Vinmeen HD)

Vasantham Dramas

Weekdays (5.30pm & 6.30pm)

 Singa Airlines
 Bimbangal
 Thalli Pogathey
 Kannum Kannum Kolaiyadital
 Moondravathu Kann
 Iruvar
 Azhagiya Tamizh Magal S1
 Arivaan 
 Azhagiya Tamizh Magal S2

Weekdays (6.30pm)

 Yaar?
 Yaar ? (Season 2)
Yaar ? (Season 3)
 Vettai S4 
Uyire 
Naam
Kanne Kaniyamude
Variety

 Samayal Singgari
 Rasikka Rusikka S6
 Gun Kannayiram (Comedy Sitcom)
 Rasikka Rusikka S1, S2, S3, S4, S5
 Thigil (Horror Documentary)
 Pei Vettai (Horror Documentary)
 KL to Karaikudi S1 and S2 (Travel Vlogs)

Talk Shows
 V'Buzz
Vizhuthugal S12

Game Shows
 Smart Wheel
  Vallavar S1, S2, S3

Reality Shows
 Aattam Returns
 Yuttha Medai All Stars
   Yuttha Medai Junior
   Yuttha Medai Senior
    Vaanavil Superstar 
  Big Stage Tamil

Award Shows
 South Indian International Movie Awards
 Edison Awards

Prank Shows
Eneke vaa
Pettikulle Enna
Kurumbu

Notable hosts
 Lingkesvaran Maniam
 Bala Ganapathi William
 Nithya Shree
 Punnagai Poo' Gheetha
 Sangeeta Krishnasamy

References

External links
 Official site

Astro Malaysia Holdings television channels
Television channels and stations established in 2013
Tamil-language television channels
Vinmeen HD